Bob, Bobby, Bobbie, Robbie, Robby, Rob, Robert, or similar, surnamed April, may refer to:

People
 Bobby April, Jr. (born 1953), U.S. American football coach, father of Bobby April III
 Bobby April III, U.S. American football coach, son of Bobby April, Jr.

Characters
 Robert "Bob" April, a fictional character from Star Trek, the original captain of USS Enterprise NCC-1701

See also
 April (surname)
 April (disambiguation)